Scinax cretatus is a frog in the family Hylidae endemic to Brazil.

This frog lives near the edges of coastal forests and lakes.

The adult male frog measures 25.8 to 34.7 mm in snout-vent length and the adult female frog 29.2 to 32.5 mm.  The skin on the dorsum is dark brown with white dorsolateral stripes.

References

Frogs of South America
 Animals described in 2011
cretatus